James Bovill (born 2 June 1971 in High Wycombe, Buckinghamshire) is a former English cricketer who played first-class cricket for Hampshire from 1993 to 1997.

Bovill was educated at Charterhouse School and Durham University. He was a right-arm fast-medium bowler and a right-handed tail-end batsman. He joined Hampshire in 1993, and played 36 first-class matches and 18 one-day matches for the club. He took 99 first-class wickets for Hampshire, his best performance coming in Hampshire's first match in the 1995 County Championship, when he took 6 for 39 and 6 for 29 against Durham.

At the end of the 1997 County Championship season Bovill was released by Hampshire. In 1998 he joined Buckinghamshire, representing the county in one-day matches in the NatWest Trophy before retiring from cricket at the end of the 1999 season.

References

External links
James Bovill on Cricinfo
James Bovill on CricketArchive

1971 births
Living people
Sportspeople from High Wycombe
People educated at Charterhouse School
Alumni of Durham University
English cricketers
Hampshire cricketers
Buckinghamshire cricketers
British Universities cricketers